Maximiliano Ferreira may refer to:

 Maximiliano Ferreira (footballer, born 1989), Argentine midfielder for Club Atlético Brown
 Maximiliano Ferreira (footballer, born 1999), Uruguayan midfielder for Club Sportivo Cerrito